The oblique lattice is one of the five two-dimensional Bravais lattice types. The symmetry category of the lattice is wallpaper group p2. The primitive translation vectors of the oblique lattice form an angle other than 90° and are of unequal lengths.

Crystal classes 
The oblique lattice class names, Schönflies notation, Hermann-Mauguin notation, orbifold notation, Coxeter notation, and wallpaper groups are listed in the table below.

References 

Lattice points
Crystal systems